Faysal Galab is a Yemeni-American who grew up in the suburbs of Buffalo, New York. In 2002, he was arrested as part of the War on Terror together with the other members of the "Lackawanna Six", based on the fact the group of friends had attended an Afghan training camp together years earlier. Along with the others he was convicted of "providing support or resources to a foreign terrorist organization", and received a seven-year sentence.

Life
Galab was born to James Galab, a steelworker at Bethlehem Steel in Lackawanna, NY. Galab graduated from high school, married and worked as a car salesman.

Taher, Moseb and Galeb all decided to leave together after Sahim Alwan made it clear he wanted to return home and was unhappy with the tone of the camp. They were driven to Quetta, and rather than wait a day for the next plane, took a bus to Karachi so they could leave Pakistan immediately.

References

American people imprisoned on charges of terrorism
Buffalo Six
Living people
People from Lackawanna, New York
Year of birth missing (living people)